Jacqueline Maquet (born 13 May 1949) is a member of the National Assembly of France.  She represents the Pas-de-Calais department, and is a member of La République En Marche!, formerly a deputy for the Socialist Party.

References

1949 births
Living people
Women members of the National Assembly (France)
Deputies of the 13th National Assembly of the French Fifth Republic
Deputies of the 14th National Assembly of the French Fifth Republic
Deputies of the 15th National Assembly of the French Fifth Republic
21st-century French women politicians
Socialist Party (France) politicians
La République En Marche! politicians
Members of Parliament for Pas-de-Calais
Deputies of the 16th National Assembly of the French Fifth Republic